The Naturist Society (TNS) is an American naturist organization based in Oshkosh, Wisconsin, United States. It publishes a quarterly periodical called Nude & Natural which contains articles on naturist activities and issues related to naturism. The Naturist Society was established by Lee Baxandall in 1980. Baxandall was the Society president for a number of years.  Baxandall formulated the initial TNS motto:  "Body acceptance is the goal, nude recreation is the way."  This statement incorporates the belief that the human body is not intrinsically offensive and that the practice of social nudity can be affirming, not degrading.

Membership and activities 
The TNS Naturist Network includes both private nudist resorts and naturist social clubs that agree to TNS principles and standards. Most TNS-affiliated nudist resorts are also chartered by the American Association for Nude Recreation, and the TNS membership card usually has equal status to the AANR membership card at resorts. TNS includes an equal opportunities statement in its participating agreement for its Naturist Network, which includes nudist resorts. It notes that its members must not "discriminate on the basis of age, sex, race, national origin, religion, disability, or sexual orientation."  But "TNS acknowledges that single male visitors may be subject to a quota if a club or resort deems this unavoidable."  The Naturist Society issues joint membership cards to same-sex couples.

In the 1990s, TNS established two nonprofit adjunct organizations, governed by a board of directors elected by the TNS membership: The Naturist Action Committee, its political and legislative lobbying adjunct, and the Naturist Education Foundation. TNS advocates for the acceptance of skinny-dipping and nude sunbathing at designated clothing-optional public beaches. A 2006 Roper Poll commissioned by the Naturist Education Foundation found that 74% of Americans accept this idea.

TNS publishes a quarterly periodical called Nude & Natural (commonly called N magazine) which contains articles on naturist activities and issues related to naturism. TNS launched in 1981 its magazine, initially called Clothed with the Sun, which was edited by TNS founder Lee Baxandall. The magazine was renamed Nude & Natural in 1989. Membership in The Naturist Society includes a subscription to N magazine.

TNS also supports various special interest groups for TNS members who share hobbies or other interests such as amateur radio.

See also 
 American Association for Nude Recreation
 Clothes free movement
 Gymnophobia
 Issues in social nudity
 List of public outdoor clothes free places
 N Magazine
 Nude swimming
 Public nudity

References

External links 
 The Naturist Society Web Site
 The Naturist Amateur Radio SIG
 Naturist Education Foundation

Oshkosh, Wisconsin
Clothing free organizations
Naturism in the United States
1980 establishments in the United States
Organizations established in 1980
Non-profit organizations based in Wisconsin